Penguin Islet is a small island nature reserve with an area of 3.46 ha in Bass Strait, south-eastern Australia. It is part of Tasmania’s Hunter Island Group which lies between north-west Tasmania and King Island. It is notable as the only pelican colony in western Bass Strait.

Fauna
The island forms part of the Hunter Island Group Important Bird Area.  Breeding seabirds and shorebirds include little penguin, short-tailed shearwater, fairy prion, common diving-petrel, white-faced storm-petrel, Pacific gull, silver gull, sooty oystercatcher, black-faced cormorant, Australian pelican and Caspian tern.

References

See also
 Penguin Island (Tasmania)
 Tasmania's offshore islands

 Islands of North West Tasmania
 Protected areas of Tasmania
Bass Strait
 Important Bird Areas of Tasmania